In mathematical finite group theory, a Thompson factorization, introduced by , is an expression of some finite groups as a product of two subgroups, usually normalizers or centralizers of p-subgroups for some prime p.

References

Finite groups